Sainte Rose du Lac (often abbreviated Ste Rose du Lac) is an unincorporated urban community in the Municipality of Ste. Rose, Manitoba, Canada.

Prior to 1 January 2015, it was designated as a town. It is located approximately 50 km east-southeast of Dauphin, and approximately 300 km west-northwest of Winnipeg. Ste Rose du Lac had a population of 1,023 as of the 2011 Census.

It is served by Laurier railway station and Sainte Rose du Lac Airport.

Demographics 
In the 2021 Census of Population conducted by Statistics Canada, Ste.

Media 
A retransmitter of CKSB (St. Boniface), CKSB-1, first went on the air as CBKB on the AM frequency of 860 kHz on February 1, 1968.

Radio-Canada applied in 2012 to move its broadcast tower that transmits CKSB-FM-1 (Ici Radio-Canada Premiere) to Ste. Rose du Lac, from Starbuck. CKSB-FM-1 now broadcasts on 88.1 MHz.

References

External links
 Ste.Rose Webpage

Designated places in Manitoba
Unincorporated communities in Parkland Region, Manitoba
Unincorporated urban communities in Manitoba
Manitoba communities with majority francophone populations
Sainte Rose
Populated places disestablished in 2015